Walter Charles Cook (1 July 1894 – 1973) was an English professional footballer who played as a goalkeeper in the Football League for Plymouth Argyle, Brighton & Hove Albion and Stockport County. He was on the books of Leeds City before the League resumed after the First World War, and played non-league football for Castleford Town and Harrogate.

Life and career
Walter Charles Cook was born to Joseph and Ellen Cook in Midsomer Norton, Somerset, on 1 July 1894. He had blue eyes and brown hair. By 1901, the family had moved to Castleford, in the West Riding of Yorkshire, where Joseph was working as a coal miner. The 1911 Census records the 16-year-old Cook employed as a pony driver underground. He enlisted in the Cameronians in 1915, served in France, and was discharged in 1917 as physically unfit for military service. His discharge papers described him as a "sober, honest and diligent soldier, discharged on account of a wound sustained in action." He married Beatrice Haley in March 1918, and gave his occupation as miner.

Cook played for Leeds City immediately after the First World War, but had left the club for Midland League club Castleford Town of the Midland League before the Football League resumed. Together with Cecil Eastwood and Joe Little, Cook moved on to Plymouth Argyle in May 1920. A backup to the long-serving Fred Craig, Cook eventually made his Football League debut in December 1921, but played just seven matches before joining another Third Division South club, Brighton & Hove Albion, in 1924 for a £400 fee.

He was a first-team regular during his first season with Albion, but was displaced by Stan Webb in his second and left the club. He joined Darlington on a month's trial later that year, but did not make a first-team appearance. He played nine matches in the Third Division North and two in the FA Cup for Stockport County during the first half of the 1928–29 season, before finishing his career in non-league football with Harrogate.

The 1939 Register lists Cook living in Harrogate, Yorkshire, and working as a motorworks fitter's labourer. He died in Harrogate in 1973.

References

1894 births
1973 deaths
People from Midsomer Norton
Sportspeople from Castleford
Association football goalkeepers
English footballers
Leeds City F.C. players
Castleford Town F.C. players
Plymouth Argyle F.C. players
Brighton & Hove Albion F.C. players
Darlington F.C. players
Stockport County F.C. players
Harrogate Town A.F.C. players
Midland Football League players
English Football League players
Cameronians soldiers
British Army personnel of World War I